This is a list of airlines which have a current Air Operator Certificate issued by the Afghanistan's Ministry of Transport and Civil Aviation.

Scheduled airlines

See also
List of airlines
List of air carriers banned in the European Union
List of defunct airlines of Afghanistan
List of airports in Afghanistan
List of defunct airlines of Asia

References

 
Afghanistan
Airlines
Airlines
Afghanistan